Yevgeni Yuryevich Klimov (born 21 January 1985) is a Kazakhstani former professional footballer. He also holds Russian citizenship.

Career statistics

International

Statistics accurate as of match played 29 February 2012

References

External links
 
 

1985 births
Living people
Kazakhstani footballers
Association football defenders
Kazakhstan international footballers
PFC CSKA Moscow players
FC Dynamo Stavropol players
FC Vostok players
FC Bayterek players